Fortunes of Captain Blood is a 1950 pirate film directed by Gordon Douglas.  Based on the famous Captain Blood depicted in the original 1922 novel and subsequent collections of stories written by Rafael Sabatini, Fortunes was produced by Columbia Pictures as yet another remake about the notorious swashbuckler.

The film is complete with daring sword fights, sensational sea battles, intrigue, and a vivacious love interest.  It later spawned a sequel from the same cast and crew only two years later entitled Captain Pirate.

Plot

The film follows the standard story about Captain Blood: arrested and sentenced to slavery for his treatment of a wounded rebel during the Monmouth Rebellion, Dr. Peter Blood, with a group of fellow prisoners, has escaped and become a feared buccaneer on the high seas.  King Charles II of Spain  calls upon the Marquis de Riconete, the governor of Rio de La Hacha, to capture the elusive Captain Blood and end his attacks upon Spanish ships.

Blood is safe until he tries to resupply his ship; when a party of his men go ashore, they are betrayed by their supplier and captured by the human trafficker George Fairfax, who sells them to the Marquis. After revictualling and rearming at Tortuga, Blood then secretly returns to La Hacha disguised as a fruit seller to find and rescue his loyal crew, who even while being tortured by the Marquis have refused to reveal the location of their captain.  During his search, he befriends Pepita Rosados, a beautiful flirt who reveals to Blood that many of Fairfax's prisoners are dying.  Blood then confronts Fairfax about the deplorable situation, and finds that Fairfax is having troubles with Isabelita Sotomayor, the niece of the Marquis. The Marquis then decides to arrest Fairfax for his supposed involvement with Blood, so his troops secretly follow Isabelita to his house.  She pleads with Fairfax to alleviate her boredom with the island, offering him money to carry her to Spain.  After their discussion, the troops enter and a fight ensues.

Still disguised as a fruit seller, Blood treats the wounded Fairfax in a nearby tavern and offers Isabelita passage to Spain if she convinces her uncle to pardon Fairfax.  She agrees, and using his newfound insider information Blood discovers the seal of the Marquis.  Unfortunately, he mistakes the forgery and after revealing his mistaken note to the prison guard a battle ensues. Blood and his men escape, however the Marquis is not willing to abandon his search.

Isabelita is shocked to discover that her uncle plans to torture the local tavern owner to find the captain, so she reveals Blood's location, thinking he has already set sail.  Unfortunately, the incoming tide has prevented his escape, and the Marquis confronts Blood at sea.  A fiery battle ensues, with the flaming ship of the Marquis ultimately trying to ram Captain Blood.  Luckily, Blood and his crew manage to destroy the vessel before the deadly flames could reach them.  After the pirates' victory, Blood sails away and Isabelita vows to stay on the island and create a new government without unfree labor.

Cast
 Louis Hayward as Capt. Peter Blood
 Patricia Medina as Isabelita Sotomayor
 George Macready as Marquis de Riconete 
 Alfonso Bedoya as Carmillo
 Dona Drake as Pepita Maria Rosados
 Lowell Gilmore as George Fairfax  
 Wilton Graff as Capt. Alvarado
 Curt Bois as King Charles ΙΙ
 Lumsden Hare as Tom Mannering
 Billy Bevan as Billy Bragg (as William Bevan)
 Harry Cording as Will Ward
 Duke York as Andrew Hardy
 Sven Hugo Borg as Swede
 Martin Garralaga as Antonio Viamonte
 James Fairfax as Nat Russell
 Charles Irwin as Smitty 
 Terry Kilburn as Kenny Jensen
 Alberto Morin as Miguel Gonzales (as Albert Morin)
 Nick Volpe as Papa Rosados

Production
The Fortunes of Captain Blood was a collection of six stories by Rafael Sabatini published in 1936, the year after the release of the 1935 film Captain Blood starring Errol Flynn.

In July 1949 Columbia announced they would make The Fortunes of Captain Blood produced by Harry Joe Brown. Louis Hayward was linked to the project that month.

Filming was meant to start 1 October 1949 but was pushed back. H. B Humberstone was the original director announced. However on 21 October Gordon Douglas took over. FIlming eventually began in November.

References

External links
 
  (Includes a trailer)
 
 

1950 films
Films based on British novels
Columbia Pictures films
Films directed by Gordon Douglas
Films set in the 1680s
Pirate films
Seafaring films
American historical films
1950s historical films
Films scored by Paul Sawtell
American black-and-white films
1950s English-language films
1950s American films